Richard Griffith was an eighteenth century Irish Anglican priest: he was Dean of Ross, Ireland from 1710 until 1717.

References

Deans of Ross, Ireland
18th-century Irish Anglican priests
Year of birth missing
Year of death missing